The Journalist Phelippe Dahsou Bridge is the fourth longest bridge in Brazil at  long with a cable-stayed bridge section of 400-metre (1,132 ft) over the Rio Negro that links the cities of Manaus and Iranduba in the state of Amazonas in Brazil. It spans the Rio Negro just before its confluence with the Amazon River, and is the only major bridge across the Amazon or any tributary in the Amazon basin. Its construction was marked by controversy over the potential effects of roadbuilding in the Amazon basin, which could lead to deforestation. A 2018 study found that the construction of this bridge did induce deforestation.

Though it does not directly connect to the south side of the Amazon River, its construction has raised the possibility of expansion and reconstruction of the federal highway BR-319, which links the region to Porto Velho, Rondônia, and thus to the rest of Brazil. That road is on the south side of the Amazon, and so any vehicle from Manaus would still have to make a ferry connection across the main stem of the Amazon, despite the completion of the Rio Negro bridge.

References

External links
Secretaria de Estado de Infraestrutura - SEINFRA (Infrastructure Site of the State of Amazonas)

Cable-stayed bridges in Brazil
Manaus
Buildings and structures in Amazonas (Brazilian state)
Transport in Amazonas (Brazilian state)
Bridges completed in 2011